Vladimirea kahirica is a moth in the family Gelechiidae. It was described by Povolný in 1967. It is found in Algeria.

References

Vladimirea
Moths described in 1967